Cashmere High School is a public high school located in Cashmere, Washington.

Athletics

Teams
Cashmere's athletic teams are nicknamed The Bulldogs and Cashmere teams compete in the following sports:

Cross Country
Football
Volleyball
Girls' Soccer
Boys' Soccer
Girls' Swimming
Boys' Swimming
Girls' Basketball
Boys' Basketball
Wrestling
Softball
Baseball
Tennis
Track and Field

Demographics
63% of the student population at Cashmere identify as Caucasian, 33% identify as Hispanic, 2% identify as multiracial, 1% identify as African American, 1% identify as Asian, and 1% identify as American Indian or Alaskan Native. The student body makeup is 49% male and 51% female.

Notable alumni
Hailey Van Lith, female basketball player

References

Public high schools in Washington (state)
Schools in Chelan County, Washington